Jon G. Burns (born September 4, 1952) is an American politician from Georgia and the Speaker of the Georgia House of Representatives since January 2023. Burns is a Republican member of the Georgia House of Representatives from District 159. Burns previous served District 157. Burns is also the current Majority Leader of Georgia House of Representatives. He was selected as the next Speaker in November 2022, succeeding David Ralston.

Early life 
Burns was born in Effingham County, Georgia. Burns graduated from Effingham County High School.

Education 
Burns earned a bachelor's degree in political science from Georgia Southern University. Burns earned a JD from John Marshall Law School.

Career 
Burns served in the Georgia Army National Guard.

On November 2, 2004, Burns won the election and became a Republican member of Georgia House of Representatives for District 157. Burns defeated Woodrow Lovett with 65.05% of the votes. On November 7, 2006, as an incumbent, Burns won the election unopposed and continued serving District 157. On November 4, 2008, as an incumbent, Burns won the election unopposed and continued serving District 157. On November 2, 2010, as an incumbent, Burns won the election and continued serving District 157. Burns defeated Elizabeth N. Johnson with 67.36% of the votes.

On November 6, 2012, Burns won the election unopposed and became a Republican member of Georgia House of Representatives for District 159. On November 4, 2014, as an incumbent, Burns won the election unopposed and continued serving District 159. On November 8, 2016, as an incumbent, Burns won the election unopposed and continued serving District 159. On November 6, 2018, as an incumbent, Burns won the election unopposed and continued serving District 159. On November 3, 2020, as an incumbent, Burns won the election unopposed and continued serving District 159.

In 2015, Burns was elected as the Majority Leader of Georgia House of Representatives.

Personal life 
Burns' wife is Dayle Burns. They have two children. Burns and his family live in Newington, Georgia.

See also 
 2013 152nd Georgia General Assembly
 2015 153rd Georgia General Assembly
 2017 154th Georgia General Assembly

References

External links 
 Jon G. Burns at ballotpedia.org
 Jon Burns at gagop.org
 Jon Burns at friendsofjonburns.com
 Jon Burns at followthemoney.org
 Theodore Johnson (intern)

|-

|-

|-

1952 births
21st-century American politicians
Atlanta's John Marshall Law School alumni
Living people
Republican Party members of the Georgia House of Representatives
People from Effingham County, Georgia